The Sisters (also known as the Sisters Olive Trees of Noah) are a grove of sixteen olive trees in the Lebanese town of Bcheale. 

According to local folklore, the trees are at least 5,000 years old, perhaps even 6,000 years old or older. If this is correct, they may be the oldest non-clonal living trees in the world.  The age of any of The Sisters has not been determined by dendrochronology (tree-ring dating) and possibly cannot be due to deterioration of the inner tree ring structures over time.

Folk legend also ascribes The Sisters as the source of the olive branch returned to Noah's Ark at the waning of the Biblical Flood. The trees still produce olives, and a preservation effort was undertaken by the non-profit organization Sisters Olive Oil, which marketed oil from these olives.

See also
 List of individual trees
 List of oldest trees

References

Individual trees in Lebanon
Batroun District
Tourist attractions in Lebanon
Individual olive trees